Official relations exist between Australia and South Sudan. While the two countries do not have official embassies in each other's nation, they share a strong and common tie.

Historical and current tie
Both were formerly parts of the British Empire, and use the English language as the main language in both nations.

Throughout the Sudanese Civil Wars (1955–1972 and 1983–2005), many South Sudanese refugees had sought refuge in Kenya, in which Australia would be one of the first countries to announce their support in resettling South Sudanese refugees to the country. Thus, the South Sudanese community in Australia was the first ever organized African community in Australia, and also the largest African diaspora in the country.

When South Sudan gained independence in 2011, Australia was one of the first countries to recognize South Sudan. However, due to the ongoing South Sudanese Civil War, this forced Australia to play its peacekeeping role over the nation. Although due to large South Sudanese diaspora in the country, Australia was asked to take a larger role.

South Sudanese in Australia
South Sudanese refugees first arrived to Australia during 1990s.

While South Sudanese community in Australia tends to be well-integrated, racial abuses and racism remain an issue in the country. Ongoing crime activities caused by South Sudanese gangs prompted hostility and racial xenophobia against South Sudanese by Australians caused fears for growing South Sudanese people in the country. Racial issue also played a reason for the cancel of South Sudanese Australian Basketball Association Summer Slam in 2018.

Nonetheless, a number of famous South Sudanese Australians had taken steps to slow anti-South Sudanese sentiment in Australia. Notable figures include Awer Mabil, who won FIFA global award for his charity works over South Sudanese refugees in Kenya; to Thomas Deng, Abraham Majok and Bruce Kamau.

See also
South Sudanese Australians

References

 
South Sudan
Bilateral relations of South Sudan